Gerrit de Jong Jr. (28 March 1892, Amsterdam – 26 September 1978, Provo, Utah) was an American academic and the first dean of the College of Fine Arts at Brigham Young University (BYU).

de Jong was skilled in music and wrote the words and music for the Latter-day Saint hymn, "Come Sing to the Lord," which is number 10 in the 1985 hymnal. Even though he was dean of the College of Fine Arts, de Jong spent most of his career teaching foreign languages. He was known as "Mr. Portuguese" because of his knowledge of Portuguese and Brazilian literature. The de Jong Concert Hall at BYU is named in his honor.

Personal life
de Jong is the son of Gerrit de Jong and Lida Marianna Kuiper. He converted to the Church of Jesus Christ of Latter-day Saints (LDS Church) from the Dutch Reformed (Protestant) tradition in his late teens.

References

External links
Archival materials relating to Gerrit De Jong, L. Tom Perry Special Collections, Harold B. Lee Library, Brigham Young University

1892 births
1978 deaths
Latter Day Saints from Utah
Brigham Young University faculty
Converts to Mormonism
Jong, Gerrit de
Jong, Gerrit de
Jong, Gerrit de